Events from the year 1940 in Michigan.

Top stories
The Associated Press polled editors of its member newspapers in Michigan and ranked the state's top news stories of 1940 as follows:
 The Armistice Day storm that killed 67 persons and destroyed five vessels on Lake Michigan
 The indictment of Frank McKay, Michigan's Republican national committeeman on federal mail fraud charges
 Michigan's contribution to the national defense effort, including conversion of automobile manufacturing facilities to the production of airplanes, tanks, and machine guns; draft registration of 672,000 men; national guardsmen called to a year's training; and Henry Ford expressing his view on the new war
 The November 5 election, including the defeat of 81-year-old Governor Luren Dickinson by Democrat Murray Van Wagoner; widespread ballot-splitting; and a victory for advocates of a statewide civil service system
 The indictment of numerous Detroit and Wayne County officials on graft charges, including Wayne County Prosecutor Duncan C. McRea, Detroit Mayor Richard Reading, Wayne County Sheriff Thomas C. Wilcox, and Detroit Police Superintendent Fred Frahm
 1940 Detroit Tigers season, including the declaration of young players to be free agents, the American League pennant, Bobo Newsom's performance, and defeat in the 1940 World Series
 Wendell Willkie's visit to Michigan, where he was targeted with tomatoes, eggs and other objects, and his narrow victory over Franklin Roosevelt in the November 5 vote count in Michigan
 Tom Harmon's All-American performance for the 1940 Michigan Wolverines football team
 The service of Matilda Dodge Wilson as the first woman to serve as Michigan's Lieutenant Governor, a position she held from January 1, 1940, to January 1, 1941
 The defeat of Michigan Attorney General Thomas Read in his campaign for renomination by a bloc seeking to end "boss rule" of the state's Republican Party

Other stories receiving votes included a political fight over the extent of state aid for the care and treatment of crippled children; a murder-suicide of Wayne County Judge Robert Sage and two of his associates; the 1940 Census results entitling Michigan to an additional congressman and showed a population shift away from urban districts; Congressional approval for construction of the Mackinac Bridge; and the appointment of former Governor Frank Murphy to the U.S. Supreme Court.

Office holders

State office holders
 Governor of Michigan: Luren Dickinson (Republican)
 Lieutenant Governor of Michigan: Matilda Dodge Wilson (Republican) 
 Michigan Attorney General: Thomas Read (Republican) 
 Michigan Secretary of State: Harry Kelly (Republican)
 Speaker of the Michigan House of Representatives: Howard Nugent (Republican)
 Chief Justice, Michigan Supreme Court:

Mayors of major cities
 Mayor of Detroit: Edward Jeffries (Republican)
 Mayor of Grand Rapids: George W. Welsh (Republican)
 Mayor of Flint: Harry M. Comins/Oliver Tappin/William Osmund Kelly
 Mayor of Lansing: Max A. Templeton
 Mayor of Saginaw: John W. Symons, Jr.

Federal office holders
 U.S. Senator from Michigan: Prentiss M. Brown (Democrat)
 U.S. Senator from Michigan: Arthur Vandenberg (Republican) 
 House District 1: Rudolph G. Tenerowicz (Democrat)
 House District 2: Earl C. Michener (Republican)
 House District 3: Paul W. Shafer (Republican)
 House District 4: Clare Hoffman (Republican)
 House District 5: Bartel J. Jonkman (Republican)
 House District 6: William W. Blackney (Republican)
 House District 7: Jesse P. Wolcott (Republican)
 House District 8: Fred L. Crawford (Republican)
 House District 9: Albert J. Engel (Republican)
 House District 10: Roy O. Woodruff (Republican)
 House District 11: Frederick Van Ness Bradley (Republican)
 House District 12: Frank Eugene Hook (Democrat)
 House District 13: Clarence J. McLeod (Republican)
 House District 14: Louis C. Rabaut (Democrat)
 House District 15: John D. Dingell Sr. (Democrat)
 House District 16: John Lesinski Sr. (Democrat)
 House District 17: George Anthony Dondero (Republican)

Population

Companies
The following is a list of major companies based in Michigan in 1940.

Sports

Baseball
 1940 Detroit Tigers season – Under manager Del Baker, the Tigers compiled a 90–64 record, won the American League pennant, and defeated the Cincinnati Reds in the 1940 World Series. Left fielder Hank Greenberg led Major League Baseball (MLB) with 150 RBIs, 99 extra-base hits, and a .674 slugging percentage. Center fielder Barney McCosky led MLB with 200 hits and 19 triples. Greenberg and McCosky both compiled .340 batting averages. Bobo Newsom led the pitching staff with at 21-5 record, a 2.83 earned run average, and 164 strikeouts.
 1940 Michigan Wolverines baseball season - Under head coach Ray Fisher, the Wolverines compiled a 10–12 record. Charles Pinka was the team captain.

American football
 1940 Detroit Lions season – Under head coach Potsy Clark, the Lions compiled a 5–5–1 record. The team's statistical leaders included Whizzer White led the team with 514 rushing yards, 461 passing yards, and 32 points scored, and Lloyd Cardwell with 349 receiving yards. 
 1940 Michigan Wolverines football team – Under head coach Fritz Crisler, the Wolverines compiled a 7-1 record and were ranked No. 3 in the final AP Poll.  Tom Harmon won the 1940 Heisman Trophy.
 1940 Michigan State Spartans football team – Under head coach Charlie Bachman the Spartans compiled a 3–4–1 record.
 1940 Detroit Titans football team – Under head coach Gus Dorais, the Titans compiled a 7–2 record.
 1940 Wayne State Tartars football team - Under head coach Joe Gembis, the team compiled a 4–1–3 record.
 1940 Central Michigan Bearcats football team - Under head coach Ron Finch, the team compiled a 4–3–1 record.
 1940 Western State Broncos football team - Under head coach Mike Gary, the team compiled a 2–5 record.
 1940 Michigan State Normal Hurons football team - Under head coach Elton Rynearson, the team compiled a 1–5–1 record.

Basketball
 1939–40 Detroit Titans men's basketball team – Bob Calihan, the Titans' 6-foot, 4-inch center, concluded his playing career with 332 points in 24 games. In three seasons with the Titans, Calihan scored 795 points in 63 games.
 1939–40 Michigan Wolverines men's basketball team – Under head coach Bennie Oosterbaan, the Wolverines compiled a 13–7 record. James Rae led the team with 199 points.

Ice hockey
 1939–40 Detroit Red Wings season – Under head coach Jack Adams, the Red Wings compiled a 16–26–6 record. Syd Howe led the team with 14 goals, 23 assists, and 37 points. Tiny Thompson was the team's goalkeeper in 46 of 48 games. Ebbie Goodfellow was the team captain.

Boat racing
 APBA Gold Cup – Sidney Allen won the Gold Cup in the Hotsy Totsy III.
 Port Huron to Mackinac Boat Race – The yawl Manitou, skippered by James Rowland Lowe, won the annual yacht race on July 14, setting a new record time of 32 hours, 45 minutes.

Boxing
 Heavyweight champion Joe Louis defended his heavyweight title in four matches against Arturo Godoy (February 9, split decision), Johnny Paychek (March 29, TKO), Arturo Godoy (June 20, TKO), and Al McCoy (December 16, corner retirement).

Golfing
 Michigan Open - Emerick Kocsis won the Michigan Open on August 18 at the Midland Country Club in Midland, Michigan

Chronology of events

January

February
 February 19 - Republican Bartel J. Jonkman was elected in a special election to fill the vacancy left by Republican U.S. Congressman Carl E. Mapes's death in office on December 12, 1939.

March

April

May

June

July

August

September
 September 10 - The gubernatorial primaries occurred for the November 5th election. The results:
Democratic primary - Murray Van Wagoner becomes the Democratic nominee for governor, defeating Eugene Van Antwerp.
Republican primary - Luren Dickinson becomes the Republican nominee for governor, defeating Thomas Read.

October

November
 November 5 - A number of elections occurred, including:
President of the United States - Republican nominee Wendell Willkie defeats incumbent Democratic President Franklin D. Roosevelt in Michigan with 49.85% of the popular vote. Willkie is defeated by Roosevelt nationally.
United States Senate - Incumbent Republican U.S. Senator Arthur Vandenberg was re-elected.
United States House of Representatives - All of Michigan's 17 U.S. Representatives won re-election except for Republican Clarence J. McLeod, who was defeated by Democrat George D. O'Brien. In the delegation, there were five Democrats and twelve Republicans.
 Michigan Governor - Democratic nominee Murray Van Wagoner defeated incumbent Republican Governor Luren Dickinson.

December

Births
 January 31 - George Mans, American football player and coach, in Detroit
 February 15 - Leon Ware, songwriter and producer for Marvin Gaye and Michael Jackson, in Detroit
 February 19 - Smokey Robinson, singer, songwriter, and record producer, and the founder and front man of the Motown vocal group The Miracles, in Detroit
 May 10 - Stephen M. Ross, real estate developer and sports team owner, in Detroit
 May 10 - Wayne Dyer, self-help author and a motivational speaker, in Detroit
 May 12 - Norman Whitfield, songwriter and producer ("I Heard It Through the Grapevine", "Just My Imagination (Running Away with Me)" ) credited with creating the Motown sound, in Harlem, New York City
 July 6 - Rex Cawley, gold medalist 400 meter hurdles at 1964 Summer Olympics, in Highland Park, MI
 August 22 - Bill McCartney, American football coach and the founder of the Promise Keepers men's ministry, in Riverview, MI
 August 29 - Bennie Maupin, jazz multireedist, in Detroit
 October 16 - Dave DeBusschere, Basketball Hall of Fame, in Detroit
 November 2 - Ed Budde, American football guard 5× AFL All-Star, in Highland Park, MI
 November 11 - Dennis Coffey, guitarist known for his 1971 Top 10 hit single "Scorpio", in Detroit

Deaths
 August 18 - Walter Chrysler, founder of Chrysler Corporation, at age 65 in Kings Point, NY

See also
 History of Michigan
 History of Detroit

References